The Tuscarora War was fought in North Carolina from September 10, 1711 until February 11, 1715 between the Tuscarora people and their allies on one side and European American settlers, the Yamassee, and other allies on the other. This was considered the bloodiest colonial war in North Carolina. The Tuscarora signed a treaty with colonial officials in 1718 and settled on a reserved tract of land in Bertie County, North Carolina. The war incited further conflict on the part of the Tuscarora and led to changes in the slave trade of North and South Carolina.

The first successful settlement of North Carolina began in 1653. The Tuscarora lived in peace with the settlers for more than 50 years, while nearly every other colony in America was involved in some conflict with Native Americans. Most of the Tuscarora migrated north to New York after the war, where they joined the Five Nations of the Iroquois Confederacy as the sixth nation.

History
The Tuscarora were an Iroquoian-speaking people who had migrated from the Great Lakes area into the Piedmont centuries before European colonization. Related peoples made up the Iroquois Confederacy based in New York and Southern Ontario.

Tensions 
As the English settled Carolina, the Tuscarora benefited from trade with the English. By acquiring weapons and metal goods from the English, they were able to develop commercial dominance over other tribes in the region. These benefits were experienced to a greater degree by Northern Tuscarora than their Southern counterparts, who became cut off from the prosperous Northern Tuscarora by increasing numbers of European settlers. Over time settlers continued to push into territory held by the Tuscarora. As the settlers moved closer to the Tuscarora and the two began interacting more frequently, conflict arose over shared hunting grounds and cultural differences. The Tuscarora held John Lawson accountable for his role in the settlers' expansion into their territory. Lawson's writings emphasized the potential that the lands held for European settlement and he was also resented for his perceived role in the founding of New Bern, a settlement which encroached on Tuscarora territory.  Settlers found eastern North Carolina to be swampy and difficult to farm, so they pushed westward attracted by the more fertile uplands. As settlement expanded, so too did the Indian slave trade in the region. These factors all led to tension between the Tuscarora and the growing population of colonists.

Outbreak of War 
There were two groups of Tuscarora in North Carolina in the early 18th century, a northern group led by Chief Tom Blount and a southern group was led by Chief Hancock. Blount occupied the area around Bertie County on the Roanoke River; Hancock was closer to New Bern, occupying the area south of the Pamlico River. Blount became close friends with the influential Blount family of the Bertie region, but Hancock's people had suffered raids and kidnappings by slave traders.

Hancock's tribe began to attack the settlers, but Blount's tribe did not become involved in the war at this point. Some historians including Richard White and Rebecca Seaman have suggested that the war grew out of misunderstandings between the colonists and the Tuscaroras. The Southern Tuscaroras led by Hancock allied with the Bear River tribe, Coree, Cothechney, Machapunga, Mattamuskeet, Neuse, Pamlico, Senequa, and Weetock to attack the settlers in a wide range within a short time period. They attacked homesteads along the Roanoke, Neuse, and Trent rivers and in the city of Bath beginning on September 22, 1711 and killed hundreds of settlers, including several key colonial political figures, such as John Lawson of Bath, while driving off others. The Baron of Bernberg was a prisoner of the Tuscarora during the raids, and he recounted stories of women impaled on stakes, more than 80 infants slaughtered, and more than 130 settlers killed in the New Bern settlement.

Barnwell's expedition 
In 1711, the North Carolina colony had been weakened by Cary's Rebellion, and Governor Edward Hyde asked South Carolina for assistance. South Carolina sent Colonel John Barnwell with a force of 30 white officers and about 500 Native Americans from South Carolina, including Yamasee, Wateree, Congaree, Waxhaw, Pee Dee, and Apalachee. Barnwell's expedition traveled over 300 miles and arrived in January 1712. There the force was supplemented by 50 local militiamen and attacked the Tuscarora, who retreated to Fort Neoheroka in Greene County. The Tuscarora negotiated a truce and released their prisoners.

Barnwell's expedition did not win the war. Barnwell left for South Carolina, displeasing the North Carolina settlers who wished for a total victory over the Tuscarora. The South Carolinians were unhappy that there was no payment for their help. Additionally, some South Carolina officers retained Tuscarora to sell as slaves, which incited the Tuscarora into a new wave of attacks. These attacks came amid a yellow fever outbreak that weakened the North Carolina colony; the combined pressure caused many settlers to flee. Governor Thomas Pollack requested the aid of South Carolina.

Chief Blount and the Moore Expedition 
South Carolina dispatched Colonel James Moore with a force of 33 colonists and nearly 1,000 Native Americans, which arrived in December 1712. The settlers offered Blount control of the entire Tuscarora tribe if he assisted them in defeating Hancock. Blount captured Hancock, and the settlers executed him in 1712.

In 1713, the Southern Tuscarora lost their Fort Neoheroka in Greene County. Neoheroka was one of several Tuscarora forts of that time. Others include Torhunta, Innennits, and Catechna. These forts were all destroyed during the Tuscarora War by North Carolina colonists. An archaeological analysis of Fort Neoheroka indicates that the Tuscarora were adapting new methods of warfare in North America, specifically the advent of firearms, explosives and artillery. Ultimately, it was not the defensive limitations of the Tuscarora that cost them at Fort Neoheroka. In fact, the fort was "...equal to, if not superior to, comparable Euro-American frontier fortifications of the same era." In actuality, the Tuscarora's defeat was not caused by inadequate fortification, but by an arsenal lacking the artillery and explosives employed by their opponents. About 950 people were killed or captured and sold into slavery in the Caribbean or New England by Colonel Moore and his South Carolina troops.

Aftermath 
Following the decisive defeat, many Tuscarora began a migration to New York. There they joined the Five Nations of the Iroquois Confederacy and were accepted as the sixth tribe. Some Tuscarora bands remained in North Carolina with Blount for decades, with the last leaving for New York in 1802.

Further conflict 
The Tuscarora War did not ensure lasting peace in the region. On Good Friday, April 15, 1715, a group of Native Americans attacked South Carolina. Among them were Apalachees, Savannahs, Lower Creeks, Cherokees, and Yamasees, as well as others. These were all allies of Colonels Barnwell and Moore during the Tuscarora War. This attack began what is known as the Yamasee War. The Yamasee and other tribes in South Carolina learned from the Tuscarora War that colonial settlers were heavily invested in the slave trade of Native Americans. Furthermore, the Tuscarora War had drastically cut down the number of Native Americans in the area who could be enslaved. With this in mind, the tribes of South Carolina decided on a preemptive attack. As one historian put it, "[b]etter to stand together as Indians, hit the colony now before it became any stronger, kill the traders, destroy the plantations, burn Charles Town, and put an end to the slave buyers." During the Yamasee War, Col. Maurice Moore, the brother of Colonel James Moore, led a regiment in the battle against the Yamasee. Among his regiment were some seventy Tuscarora warriors who were keen to fight against the Yamasee, a tribe who had fought against them during the Tuscarora War. Following the Yamasee War, these Tuscarora were asked by South Carolina officials to remain in South Carolina as their allies and to protect the colony from Spain and its Native American allies. As part of the arrangement, South Carolina would return to the Tuscarora one slave taken during the Tuscarora War for each Tuscarora killed in the line of duty and for each enemy Native American they captured. During this time, the Tuscarora came to be so well respected by the South Carolina government that they were given land in the colony. The Yamasee War and other conflicts between the remaining Tuscarora and other Native American groups in the region are examples of how the Tuscarora War destabilized relationships among southern Native Americans.

Effect on slavery 
The Tuscarora War and the Yamasee War were turning points in the Carolinas' slave trade. By 1717, South Carolina began to regulate its slave trade. Additionally, after two wars between colonists and Native Americans, the number of Native Americans available to be enslaved had fallen considerably. The most valuable role of Native Americans also shifted during this time from slave to ally because of the ongoing power struggle between the French and English to control North America. Because colonists sought to ally themselves with Native Americans, the enslavement of Black Americans began to proliferate.

Legacy 
Nearly 300 years after the Tuscarora were defeated at Fort Neoheroka, the fort was added to the National Register of Historic Places on July 17, 2009. A monument was constructed and commemorated there in March 2013. The ceremony was attended by Tuscarora descendants, some from New York and others from North Carolina.

See also
 Wars of the indigenous peoples of North America
 List of Indian massacres
 List of conflicts in British America

References

Further reading

 David La Vere. The Tuscarora War: Indians, Settlers, and the Fight for the Carolina Colonies. Chapel Hill, NC: University of North Carolina Press, 2013 
 Wayne E. Lee, "Fortify, Fight, or Flee: Tuscarora and Cherokee Defensive Warfare and Military Culture Adaptation." Journal of Military History 68 (2004): 713–770.
 Rebecca M. Seaman "John Lawson, the Outbreak of the Tuscarora Wars, and "Middle Ground" Theory", Journal of the North Carolina Association of Historians; April 2010, Vol. 18, p. 9

External links 
 NC Historic Sites: Historic Bath: The Tuscarora War, 1711–1715
 "Tuscarora War", The Way We Lived 
 Nooherooka 300th Commemoration, www.neyuheruke.org

1710s conflicts
1710s in North Carolina
1711 in North Carolina
1713 in North Carolina
1714 in North Carolina
1715 in North Carolina
1711 in the Thirteen Colonies
1712 in the Thirteen Colonies
1713 in the Thirteen Colonies
1714 in the Thirteen Colonies
1715 in the Thirteen Colonies
Conflicts in 1711
Conflicts in 1712
Conflicts in 1713
Conflicts in 1714
Conflicts in 1715
Colonial American and Indian wars
Colonial North Carolina
Military history of North Carolina
Military history of the Thirteen Colonies
Pre-statehood history of North Carolina
Tuscarora
Wars involving the indigenous peoples of North America